What Am I Doing in New Jersey? is the 12th album and sixth HBO special by American comedian George Carlin. It was recorded at the Park Performing Arts Center in Union City, New Jersey for an HBO special, and the album was released on August 15, 1988.

During Late Night with David Letterman on November 17, 1988, Carlin revealed that the working title of the special was What in God's Name Am I Doing in New Jersey?

Track listing

References

1980s American television specials
1980s in comedy
HBO network specials
Stand-up comedy concert films
George Carlin live albums
Stand-up comedy albums
Spoken word albums by American artists
Live spoken word albums
1988 live albums
1988 comedy films
1980s comedy albums
Atlantic Records albums